Norway competed at the 1906 Intercalated Games in Athens, Greece. 32 athletes, all men, competed in 12 events in 3 sports.

Athletics

Track

Field

Gymnastics

In the team all-round event, teams could consist of between 8 and 20 gymnasts, Norway won the 

Team

Carl Albert Andersen
Oskar Bye
Conrad Carlsrud
Harald Eriksen
Oswald Falch
Kristian Fjerdingen
Yngvar Fredriksen
Karl Haagensen
Harald Halvorsen
Petter Hol
Andreas Hagelund
Eugen Ingebretsen
Per Mathias Jespersen
Finn Münster
Frithjof Olsen
Carl Alfred Pedersen
Rasmus Pettersen
Thorleif Petersen
Thorleiv Røhn
Johan Stumpf

Shooting

References

Nations at the 1906 Intercalated Games
1906
Intercalated Games